Klub Piłki Siatkowej Kobiet Stal Mielec is a Polish women's volleyball team, based in Mielec, playing in the Polish Women's Volleyball League.

Current players

Trainers 
 Roman Murdza
 Maciej Banecki

See also 

 Volleyball in Poland
 Sports in Poland

External links 
 
 Official fans' website

Women's volleyball teams in Poland
Mielec
Sport in Podkarpackie Voivodeship